u John E. Cimba (born c. 1942) was a Canadian football player who played for the Hamilton Tiger-Cats. He won the Grey Cup with them in 1965 and 1967. He played college football at the University of Buffalo. He is a member of the University of Buffalo Hall of Fame, inducted in 1988. Draft candidate of The Green Bay Packers, played 4 years with The Hamilton Tiger Cats of the Canadian Football League as outside linebacker and fullback, later ran a brokerage firm and owner of several businesses in Toronto.

In a business started by his father he developed as owner 7 plants with over 100 stores in the Retail Business. In addition he developed over 200 sales force in direct marketing. Owner of several businesses. As a resident of Florida he owns a successful  business brokerage firm The Business Exchange of Florida www.TBXflorida.com

References

birthday

1940s births
Hamilton Tiger-Cats players
Players of Canadian football from Ontario
Living people
Buffalo Bulls football players
Year of birth missing (living people)